Joe Borri (born June 11, 1962, in Detroit, Michigan) is an artist and writer.  Born and raised in Detroit, Borri graduated from Northern Michigan University in 1984.  He is married and has four children.

His 2007 anthology "Eight Dogs Named Jack" was published by Momentum Books.

External links
Joe's official website

1962 births
Writers from Detroit
Living people
Northern Michigan University alumni